Stephen Edward Farrell (born 8 March 1973) is a Scottish former professional footballer who is currently manager of Scottish League Two side Dumbarton.

Playing career
Farrell began his professional career with Kilmarnock before joining Stoke City in January 1990. He made just two appearances for Stoke both coming as a substitute towards the end of the 1989–90 season. After Stoke suffered relegation Farrell returned to Scotland and had spells at St Mirren and Stranraer then dropped to Junior level with Glenafton Athletic. Farrell stepped back up to the Scottish Football League for one season with Stenhousemuir before heading back to Junior football in 1998.

Coaching career

He was appointed manager of Cumnock Juniors in March 2009, as successor to Campbell Money. In December 2012, Farrell was appointed assistant manager of Stranraer. He moved with Aitken to Dumbarton in May 2015.

Farrell returned to Stranraer in January 2017, taking up the position of manager after Brian Reid left the club by mutual consent.

In May 2021, Farrell returned to Dumbarton as manager on a two-year deal and was named League One manager of the month for September 2021. At the end of Farrell's first season in charge, the Sons were relegated via the playoffs to Scottish League Two. The following season the Sons won their first six games, with Farrell named League Two manager of the month for August 2022. He also won the award for November and December 2022, before signing a new contract with the Sons in January 2023.

Personal life
Outside football, Farrell is joint deputy General Secretary of the Prison Service Union.

Career statistics

Player
Source:

Managerial record

 Dumbarton statistics include League Cup forfeit defeat against St Mirren on 9 July 2021 (Co-vid Pandemic).

References

https://www.dumbartonfootballclub.com/news/?mode=view&id=5007

External links

Scottish footballers
Stoke City F.C. players
Kilmarnock F.C. players
St Mirren F.C. players
Stranraer F.C. players
Glenafton Athletic F.C. players
Stenhousemuir F.C. players
Kilwinning Rangers F.C. players
Cumnock Juniors F.C. players
Stranraer F.C. managers
Irvine Meadow XI F.C. players
English Football League players
Scottish Football League players
Scottish Junior Football Association players
1973 births
Living people
Scottish football managers
Scottish Professional Football League managers
Association football defenders
Dumbarton F.C. managers